Clear Audio Electronic GmbH of  Germany is a manufacturer of high fidelity audio products. Formed in 1978, their primary focus is on vinyl turntables and related products such as cartridges. One of the particularly recognisable traits of a Clearaudio turntable are their transparent (or in some models translucent) acrylic components. The more expensive turntables showcase parallel tracking rather than pivot based tone arms.

Product Lines
 Turntables
 Tonearms
 Cartridges
 Amplifiers
 Cables
 Record Cleaning Devices

See also
 List of phonograph manufacturers

External links
 Clearaudio Main Website
 Clearaudio's Music Shop Site

Phonograph manufacturers
Manufacturing companies established in 1978
Audio equipment manufacturers of Germany